Giovanna Almeida Leto (born March 24, 1983 in Como, Italy) is an Italian figure skater who represented Portugal in international competition. She competed for two seasons on the Junior Grand Prix circuit. Almeida Leto was the first skater to represent Portugal at an ISU championships, which she achieved at the 2001 World Junior Figure Skating Championships. Almeida Leto was coached by Karel Zelenka's father, Karel Zelenka Senior.

External links
 

1983 births
Living people
Italian female single skaters
Portuguese figure skaters
Italian people of Portuguese descent
Sportspeople from Como